Modern Love Is Automatic is a 2009 American comedy film directed by Zach Clark, starring Melodie Sisk, Maggie Ross and Carlos Bustamante.

Cast
 Melodie Sisk as Lorraine Schultz
 Maggie Ross as Adrian Davis
 Carlos Bustamante as Mitch
 Diana Cherkas as Emily
 Rebecca Herron as Dolores
 Morgaine Lowe as Yvonne
 Matthew Hartman as Ben
 Marissa Molnar as Antoinette
 Hannah Bennett as Alaina
 David Berkenbilt as Mr. Schultz
 Monte Brown as Sex Shop Clerk

Release
The film premiered at South by Southwest on 15 March 2009.

Reception
Neil Genzlinger of The New York Times wrote that "If nothing else", the film "leaves you curious to see what this filmmaker will do next." Michael Atkinson of The Village Voice wrote that the film "eventually becomes a portrait of an unlikely friendship", while "never losing its broad satiric sneer". Leslie Felperin of Variety wrote that "Clark’s skill at shifting tone impresses, and what at first seems like a good indie-movie laugh at the expensive of provincial hicks develops into something both more empathic and more troubling."

Nick Schager of Slant Magazine wrote that while the film "eventually becomes too one-note for its own good", Clarke's "minimalist compositions and sharp comedic beats are formally assured, amplifying his material’s deadpan humor as well as reflecting his heroine’s state of mind and heart", while Sisk "expresses an astounding array of conflicted emotions, affording a brief, striking glimpse at the wounded yearning and fear cosseted behind her iron-curtain defenses." Scott Knopf of Film Threat wrote that one of the film's "flaws" is that "Adrian’s story is much more interesting than the main character’s."

References

External links
 
 

American comedy films
2009 comedy films